Ettore Fieramosca was a protected cruiser of the Italian Regia Marina (Royal Navy) built in the 1880s. Named for the condottiero of the same name, she was the only member of her class not named for a volcano. The ship was laid down in December 1885, launched in August 1888, and was commissioned in November 1889.

Ettore Fieramosca had a relatively uneventful career; her first decade in service was confined to the normal peacetime routine of training with the Italian fleet. She thereafter spent most of her career abroad, including a deployment to China to help suppress the Boxer Uprising in 1900 and tours in African and North American waters in the mid-1900s. She was stricken from the naval register in July 1909 and sold for scrap.

Design

The four ships of the Etna class were designed in Italy as domestically produced versions of the British-built cruiser . The Italian government secured a manufacturing license from the British firm Armstrong Whitworth, but the design was revised by the Italian naval engineer Carlo Vigna. These cruisers were intended to serve as "battleship destroyers", and represented a temporary embrace of the  doctrine by the Italian naval command.

Her crew numbered 17 officers and 298 men. Designed to be a half-knot faster than her sisters, the ship had two horizontal compound steam engines, each driving a single propeller, with steam provided by four double-ended cylindrical boilers.

The main armament of the ships consisted of two Armstrong , 30-caliber breech-loading guns mounted in barbettes fore and aft. She was also equipped with a secondary battery of six , 40-caliber, breech-loading guns that were carried in sponsons along the sides of the ship. For anti-torpedo boat defense, Ettore Fieramosca was fitted with six  6-pounder Hotchkiss guns and eight  1-pounder Hotchkiss guns. Ettore Fieramosca was also armed with three  torpedo tubes. The conning tower had  worth of armor plating.

Service history
Ettore Fieramosca was built by the Regia Marina shipyard in Livorno. Her keel was laid down on 31 December 1885 and her completed hull was launched on 30 August 1888. After fitting-out work was finished, she was commissioned into the Italian fleet on 16 November 1889. Ettore Fieramosca and her sisters  and  participated in the 1893 naval maneuvers as part of the Squadron of Maneuvers. She was assigned to the 3rd Division, along with Vesuvio and the torpedo cruiser  and four torpedo boats. During the maneuvers, which lasted from 6 August to 5 September, the ships of the Reserve Squadron defended against a simulated attack by the Active Squadron, which gamed a French attack on the Italian fleet. On 1 October, she was assigned to the 3rd Department, which was stationed in Venice; she remained there through the following year.

Stomboli and Ettore Fieramosca next participated in the 1896 naval maneuvers as part of the Maneuver Fleet. In 1897, Enrico Toti served aboard the ship. Ettore Fieramosca and Vesuvio were sent to China in 1900 to assist the Eight-Nation Alliance in putting down the Boxer Uprising there.

Ettore Fieramosca returned to Italy and made a cruise off East Africa in 1905. She then sailed across the Atlantic and made a number of port visits in South America. The ship was then assigned to the American Squadron and refitted in Boston in November 1906. In 1908 she visited Bridgeport in the United States for celebrations on Columbus Day. There, bluejackets from Ettore Fieramosca and the US pre-dreadnought battleship  marched in a parade. Upon her return to Italy in 1909 Ettore Fieramosca was struck off the naval register on 15 July 1909 and sold for scrap.

Notes

References

External links

 Ettore Fieramosca Marina Militare website 

Cruisers of Italy
Etna-class protected cruisers
Ships built in Livorno
1888 ships